Shadows in the Night is a 1944 American mystery film directed by Eugene Forde and starring Warner Baxter, Nina Foch and George Zucco. It is part of the Crime Doctor series of films made by Columbia Pictures. It is also known by the alternative title of Crime Doctor's Rendezvous.

Plot summary

Cast
 Warner Baxter as Dr. Robert Ordway  
 Nina Foch as Lois Garland  
 George Zucco as Frank Swift  
 Edward Norris as Jess Hilton  
 Lester Matthews as Stanley Carter  
 Ben Welden as Nick Kallus  
 Jeanne Bates as Adele Carter 
 Charles Halton as Doc Stacey  
 Arthur Hohl as Riggs  
 Minor Watson as Frederick Gordon  
 Charles C. Wilson as Sheriff

References

Bibliography
 Erickson, Hal. From Radio to the Big Screen: Hollywood Films Featuring Broadcast Personalities and Programs. McFarland, 2014.

External links
 
 
 
 

1944 films
1944 mystery films
American mystery films
Films directed by Eugene Forde
Columbia Pictures films
American black-and-white films
Crime Doctor (character) films
1940s English-language films
1940s American films